The Page Soddy, in Harper County, Oklahoma southeast of Buffalo, Oklahoma, is a sod house built in 1902.  It was listed on the National Register of Historic Places in 1983.

The National Register of Historic Places said of it:

It is located about four miles south and four miles east of the town of Buffalo, which was founded in 1907, after the house was built.

References

Sod houses
National Register of Historic Places in Harper County, Oklahoma
Buildings and structures completed in 1902